Abdul Ghani Butt (born 15 January 1939) is a Pakistani weightlifter. He competed in the men's lightweight event at the 1960 Summer Olympics.

References

1939 births
Living people
Pakistani male weightlifters
Olympic weightlifters of Pakistan
Weightlifters at the 1960 Summer Olympics
People from Gujranwala
Weightlifters at the 1958 Asian Games
Asian Games competitors for Pakistan
20th-century Pakistani people